Acharnes (before 1915: Μενίδι Menidi) is a northwestern suburb of Athens, Attica, Greece. With 108,130 inhabitants (2021 census), it is the most populous municipality in East Attica. It is part of the Athens Urban area.

Geography

The northern part of the municipality is covered by the forested Parnitha mountain. The southern part is in the plain of Athens, and is densely populated. The built-up area of Acharnes, in this southern part of the municipality,  is continuous with that of the adjacent suburbs to the west, east and south. The centre of Acharnes is  due north of Athens city centre. The two other settlements in the municipality, Thrakomakedones and Varympompi, are situated further north, in the foothills of Parnitha.  Acharnes is crossed by several important roads and railways, including Motorway 6, the Piraeus–Platy railway and the Athens Airport–Patras railway. The Acharnes Railway Center is the main railway junction of Attica; two other stations in the municipality are Acharnes railway station and Kato Acharnes railway station, both on the Piraeus–Platy railway. Acharnes is home to the Folk Art Museum of Acharnes.

History

Acharnes has historically been an Arvanite settlement.

Acharnes was named after the deme Acharnae, a subdivision of Athens in classical antiquity. The Athenian playwright Aristophanes characterised the inhabitants of Acharnae as peasants in his play The Acharnians. Acharnes suffered significant damage from the 1999 Athens earthquake, being very close to the epicenter.

Municipality
The municipality Acharnes was formed at the 2011 local government reform by the merger of the following 2 former municipalities, that became municipal units:
Acharnes
Thrakomakedones

The municipality has an area of 149.956 km2, the municipal unit 146.406 km2.

Historical population

Crime
Acharnes is considered one of the least safest places to live in Greece since it has a relatively high crime rate, usually involving drugs, theft and gang activity. There is also a significant population of marginalized people such as  Romani living in ghettos in Acharnes, that tend to be delinquents and offenders from an early age.

Museums
The Folk Art Museum of Acharnes is a museum in Acharnes, a northern suburb of Athens, Greece. It was founded in 1977 by the local Greek Mountaineering Society, which also formed the Historical and Folklore Association in 1981, to which it bequeathed the museum in 1982. The archaeological part of the collection was then separated from the historical and folklore material and was given to the Hellenic Ministry of Culture. Former Minister Melina Mercouri founded for it the Archaeological Museum of Acharnes in a neoclassical building in the central square of Acharnes, which had formerly housed the local Town Hall. The same building houses the Historical and Folklore Society and its Folk Art Museum to the present time.

Sporting teams

Acharnaikos F.C. - second division

See also
List of municipalities of Attica

References

 
Municipalities of Attica
Populated places in East Attica
Arvanite settlements